Arnold Orowae (born June 15, 1955 in Aiopa) is a Papua New Guinean clergyman and bishop for the Roman Catholic Diocese of Wabag. He was appointed bishop in 2008.

See also
Catholic Church in Papua New Guinea

References

External links

Papua New Guinean Roman Catholic bishops
Roman Catholic bishops of Wabag
Living people
1955 births